Phillip Gaonwe Matante International Airport , also known as Francistown International Airport, serves Francistown, Botswana. The airport is on the western edge of the city. The airport was named after Philip Matante.

Facilities
The new terminal building opened in 2011 and the old terminal at the eastern end of the airport was transferred to the Botswana Defence Force. There are no jet bridges, thus passengers must walk from the terminal to designated parking areas on the tarmac in front of the terminal. A new control tower was built next to the new terminal.

The passenger terminal has an arrival and departure hall. A small retail area hosts car rental companies, an ATM and a post office.

Other tenants include Customs and Excise, Immigration, Meteorological Service Office, Air BP Fuels, and Air Botswana Offices.

Airline and destinations 

Francistown handles domestic and regional (within Africa) flights.

Botswana Defence Force Air Wing 
Francistown is home to one of three Botswana Defence Force Air Wing air bases and home to the Z3 Transport (Liaison) Squadron and the Z12 Transport Squadron.

The air base is located in the old terminal building at the east end of the airport with the large steel hangar.

See also 
Transport in Botswana
List of airports in Botswana

References

External links 
OurAirports – Francistown
SkyVector – Francistown

2011 establishments in Botswana
Buildings and structures in Francistown
Airports in Botswana